Sir Humphrey Hooke (6 August 162916 October 1677) was an English politician and businessman who served as Member of Parliament for Bristol.

References

1629 births
1677 deaths
Members of Parliament for Bristol